Roman Godziński (born 21 May 1958) is a Polish diver. He competed in the men's 3 metre springboard event at the 1980 Summer Olympics.

References

1958 births
Living people
Polish male divers
Olympic divers of Poland
Divers at the 1980 Summer Olympics
Divers from Warsaw
20th-century Polish people